Thursfield is a surname. Notable people by that name include:

 David Thursfield (born 1945), former British Ford executive
 Will Thursfield (born 1986), Australian rules footballer.
 James Thursfield (1840–1923), British naval historian.
 Martin Thursfield (born 1971), English cricketer.